is a private university in Sendai, Japan. It was founded under a Christian background (specifically the German Reformed Church, which later was known as the Reformed Church in the United States. A large part of the Reformed Church in the United States subsequently merged into what is today known as the United Church of Christ in the United States).

Times Higher Education places Tohoku Gakuin University in the 150+ bracket in its ranking of Japan's 200 best universities.

History 

The university was founded in 1886 (Meiji 19) as Sendai Theological Seminary by Oshikawa Masayoshi(1850–1928), one of Japan's first Protestants, and  Protestant missionary William Edwin Hoy. Oshikawa, an ex-samurai in Matsuyama became the seminary's first president. In 1891, the school was renamed  and a course for non-Christian students was added.

The first president Oshikawa resigned in 1901 and was succeeded by David Bowman Schneder (1857–1938). In 1904, college courses were added and authorized by the Specialized School Order. The college at first had two Departments: Letters, Theology. In 1918, Normal School and the Department of Commerce were added. In 1926, the main building (still used today) was built in Tsuchitoi Campus. Schneder left the college due to age, but even in his last days he had strong faith and gave the sermon titled "I am not ashamed of the gospel" (1936, the 50th anniversary of the school).

After the war, the college was reorganized (under Japan's new educational system) into Tohoku Gakuin University in 1949.

Faculties (Undergraduate schools)
Letters (in Tsuchitoi Campus, Aoba-ku, Sendai)
Economics (in Tsuchitoi Campus)
Business Administration (in Tsuchitoi Campus)
Law (in Tsuchitoi Campus)
Engineering (in Tagajo Campus)
Liberal Arts (in Izumi Campus, Izumi-ku, Sendai)

Graduate schools
Letters
Economics
Business Administration
Law (including Law School)
Engineering
Human Informatics (in Izumi Campus)

Notable alumni
Tōru Doi (Member of the lower house)
Takayuki Kishi (Professional baseball player)
Takeshi Koike (Announcer for Aomori Broadcasting Corporation)
Kazuko Kōri (Member of the lower house)
Takeo Mabashi (Basketball coach)
Masashi Nakano (Member of the lower house, Ministry of Economy, Trade and Industry cabinet minister)
Shunrō Oshikawa (Science fiction author)
Norio Sasaki (Composer)
Kyōka Suzuki (Actress)
Kenichi Takahashi (Professional basketball player)
Yūji Takahashi (Announcer for Iwate Menkoi Television)
Kōichi Yamadera (voice actor and actor)

References

External links
Official Website

Buildings and structures in Sendai
Christian universities and colleges in Japan
Private universities and colleges in Japan
Universities and colleges in Miyagi Prefecture
Educational institutions established in 1886
1886 establishments in Japan
Tohoku Gakuin University